Martial Caillebotte (1853–1910) was a French photographer and composer who was also one of the "Fathers of Philately", entering the Roll of Distinguished Philatelists in 1921.

Caillebotte was the younger brother of the noted artist Gustave Caillebotte (1848–1894), and they both inherited a fortune from their father, enabling them to pursue their respective passions throughout life. He married Marie Minoret on 7 June 1887. In 1888, his wife gave birth to a son, Jean, and in 1889 to a daughter, Geneviève. Geneviève inherited the majority of unsold paintings of Gustave Caillebotte.

Along with his brother, he formed a joint stamp collection around 1878 that grew to be one of the most important of its time but disposed of it in 1887, after about ten years following his marriage. The purchaser, with whom they worked on the plating, or reconstruction of the original sheet, of important issues including the Sydney View two-pence stamp of Australia, was Thomas Tapling, whose collection, including the Caillebotte collection, is part of the philatelic collection of the British Library.

References

External links 
    
 Images of photographs by Caillebotte.
 The Caillebotte Brothers, Painter and Photographer
 Martial Caillebotte
 

1853 births
1910 deaths
19th-century French male classical pianists
Artists from Paris
Fathers of philately
French philatelists
French photographers